Anthony Ronald (Tony) Wilds  (born 4 October 1943) was the Archdeacon of Plymouth from 2001 until 2010.

Ellis was educated at Durham University and Bishops' College, Cheshunt; and ordained deacon in 1966, and priest in 1967. After a curacy at Newport Pagnell he was Priest in charge of Chipili from 1972 to 1975. He was Vicar of Chandlers Ford from 1975 to 1985; and of Andover from 1985 to 1997. He was Rector of Solihull before his time as Archdeacon; and Priest in charge of Marnhull afterwards.

References

1943 births
Alumni of Durham University
Archdeacons of Plymouth
Alumni of Bishops' College, Cheshunt
Living people